John Joseph Bertrand (born March 25, 1956 in San Mateo, California) is an American former competitive sailor and Olympic silver medalist.

Career
Bertrand sailed with John Kolius on board Courageous in the 1983 America's Cup defender's trials.

At the 1984 Summer Olympics, Bertrand finished in second place in the Finn class. He was then involved in the New York Yacht Club's challenge for the 1987 Louis Vuitton Cup, first as tactician and then replacing Kolius as skipper.

He again raced alongside Kolius on Abracadabra 2000 during the 2000 Louis Vuitton Cup.

References

 

1956 births
1983 America's Cup sailors
1987 America's Cup sailors
2000 America's Cup sailors
American male sailors (sport)
Living people
Laser class world champions
Medalists at the 1984 Summer Olympics
Olympic silver medalists for the United States in sailing
Sailors at the 1984 Summer Olympics – Finn
Finn class world champions
World champions in sailing for the United States